In the runup to both the February and October United Kingdom general elections, various polling organisations conducted opinion polling to gauge voting intention amongst the general public. Such polls, dating from the previous election in 1970 to the second polling day on the on 10 October 1974, are listed in this article.

All polling data is from UK Polling Report

October general election

February general election

1974

1973

1972

1971

1970

References 

 

Opinion polling for United Kingdom general elections
February 1974 United Kingdom general election
October 1974 United Kingdom general election